Just Us was an American pop duo, consisting of songwriter Chip Taylor and session musician, Al Gorgoni. They released an album for Kapp Records in 1966 entitled I Can't Grow Peaches on a Cherry Tree. The title track was a hit single in the US, peaking at #3 on the Adult Contemporary chart and #34 on the Billboard Hot 100.

Discography

Albums
1966: I Can't Grow Peaches on a Cherry Tree
Tracklist:
Side A
"I Can't Grow Peaches on a Cherry Tree" (2:34)
"Let It Be Me" (2:09)
"I Keep Changing My Mind" (2:28)
"Only If You Love Me" (2:30)
"Wait By the Fire" (3:30)
"Reason to Believe" (2:07)
Side B"Sorry" (2:32)
"Pretty Colors" (2:11)
"Run, Boy Run" (2:06)
"I'm Not Sure What I Wanna Do" (2:19)
"Listen to the Drummer" (2:37)
"You've Got Your Troubles" (2:51)

EPs
1967: What Are We Gonna Do'''''
Tracklist
"What Are We Gonna Do"	
"Sorry"	
"Run, Boy Run"	
"Wait By the Fire"

Singles
1966: "I Can't Grow Peaches on a Cherry Tree" (#3 Adult Contemporary chart; #34 Billboard Hot 100)

References

American musical duos